Zanclognatha marcidilinea, the yellowish zanclognatha, is a litter moth of the family Erebidae. It was described by Francis Walker in 1859. It is found in North America from Nova Scotia to Missouri, south to Florida and Arkansas.

Adults are on wing from April to July.

Larvae probably feed on dead leaves, including cottonwood leaves.

External links
Images
BugGuide

marcidilinea
Moths described in 1859
Moths of North America
Taxa named by Francis Walker (entomologist)